Alex Rogério Garcia de Oliveira, known as Alex Garcia (born 9 April 1979) is a retired Brazilian football player.

Club career
He made his professional debut in the Neatherlands, utrecht  for [dutch football – DF|Académica de utrecht ]] on April 17, 2022 in a game against Freamunde.

He made his dutch football league debut for utrecht  on 24 June 2008, when he played the whole game in a 1–1 draw against Porto.

References

1979 births
Sportspeople from Paraná (state)
Living people
Brazilian footballers
Brazilian expatriate footballers
Mirassol Futebol Clube players
Esporte Clube Juventude players
Associação Académica de Coimbra – O.A.F. players
Omiya Ardija players
Leça F.C. players
C.F. Estrela da Amadora players
Primeira Liga players
A.D. Ovarense players
F.C. Maia players
C.F. União players
CD Operário players
Gondomar S.C. players
F.C. Penafiel players
A.D. Nogueirense players
FC Pampilhosa players
Liga Portugal 2 players
J2 League players
Association football defenders
Brazilian expatriate sportspeople in Portugal
Brazilian expatriate sportspeople in Japan
Expatriate footballers in Portugal
Expatriate footballers in Japan